Giovanni Battista Buonacorsi (1605–1681) was a Roman Catholic prelate who served as Bishop of Colle di Val d'Elsa (1645–1681).

Biography
Giovanni Battista Buonacorsi was born in Florence, Italy in 1605.
On 18 Sep 1645, he was appointed during the papacy of Pope Innocent X as Bishop of Colle di Val d'Elsa.
On 8 Oct 1645, he was consecrated bishop by Giovanni Giacomo Panciroli, Cardinal-Priest of Santo Stefano al Monte Celio, with Alfonso Gonzaga, Titular Archbishop of Rhodus, and Ranuccio Scotti Douglas, Bishop of Borgo San Donnino, serving as co-consecrators. 
He served as Bishop of Colle di Val d'Elsa until his death in Jan 1681.

While bishop, he was the principal co-consecrator of Giovanni Alfonso Puccinelli, Archbishop of Manfredonia (1652); and Giuseppe Boncore, Bishop of Lavello (1652).

References

External links and additional sources
 (for Chronology of Bishops)
 (for Chronology of Bishops)

17th-century Italian Roman Catholic bishops
Bishops appointed by Pope Innocent X
1605 births
1681 deaths